The Lincoln Heritage Handicap is an American Thoroughbred horse race held annually at Arlington Park in Arlington Heights, Illinois. An ungraded stakes raced on turf open to fillies and Mares, age three and older, it is contested over a distance of  miles (8.5 furlongs).

The 2009 edition had to be moved to the main track's Polytrack synthetic dirt.

Inaugurated in 1976 as the Anita Peabody Handicap, in 1998 it was renamed the Lincoln Heritage Handicap.

In 1980, 1981, 1984, and in 1988, the race was run in two divisions.

Since inception, the race has been contested at various distances on both dirt and turf:
 1 mile : 1976, 1987, on turf
 1 mile : 1985, 1988, on dirt at Hawthorne Race Course
  mile : 1977–1978 on dirt
 miles : 1980, on dirt
 miles : 1979–1984, 1986, 1989–2008, on turf
 miles : 2009, on Polytrack synthetic dirt

Records
Speed record: (at current distance of  miles on turf)
 1:42.20 – Lady Shirl (1990)

Most wins:
 3 – Lady Shirl (1990, 1991, 1993)

Most wins by a jockey:
 7 – Earlie Fires (1980, 1984, 1988 (2×), 1993, 1994, 2003)

Most wins by a trainer:
 4 – Moises Yanez (1984, 1986, 1994, 2008)
 4 – P. Noel Hickey (1990, 1991, 1993, 1996)
 4 – Chris M. Block (2000, 2001, 2004, 2009)

Most wins by an owner:
 5 – Irish Acres Farm (1990, 1991, 1993, 1996, 1997)

Winners

 † In 1994 and 1997 there was a Dead Heat for first.

References
 The 2009 Lincoln Heritage Handicap at Bloodhorse.com

Mile category horse races for fillies and mares
Horse races in Illinois
Ungraded stakes races in the United States
Turf races in the United States
Recurring sporting events established in 1976
Arlington Park
1976 establishments in Illinois